Delfines Fútbol Club was a Mexican football club based in Ciudad del Carmen, Campeche. The team last played in the Ascenso MX, the second tier of the Mexican football league system. The team played their home matches at the Estadio Unidad Deportiva Campus II de la UNACAR.

History
The team was founded on July 20, 2011 and originally played in the Segunda División de México, the third tier of the Mexican football league system. On May 20, 2013 it was announced that the team owner Grupo Delfines bought Ascenso MX club Toros Neza and relocated the team from Ciudad Nezahualcóyotl to Ciudad del Carmen, thus creating the current Delfines franchise.

Due to the team's origin, the team's squad was made up of mostly former Toros Neza players and some members from the previous Delfines franchise who played in the Segunda División.

References

External links
 Official site

Football clubs in Campeche
Association football clubs established in 2011
2011 establishments in Mexico
Ascenso MX teams
Association football clubs disestablished in 2014